Sveti Ivan Zelina is a town in Zagreb County, Croatia.

Geography
Sveti Ivan Zelina is north-east from Zagreb, connected:
  by A4 highway (Zagreb - Sv.Helena), then state road Sv.Helena - Sveti Ivan Zelina,

Population
In the 2011 Croatian census, the total population of the administrative territory of Sveti Ivan Zelina was 15,959, divided in the following settlements:

 Banje Selo, population 106
 Berislavec, population 46
 Biškupec Zelinski, population 988
 Blaškovec, population 577
 Blaževdol, population 433
 Breg Mokrički, population 45
 Brezovec Zelinski, population 167
 Bukevje, population 84
 Bukovec Zelinski, population 413
 Bunjak, population 133
 Curkovec, population 88
 Črečan, population 167
 Donja Drenova, population 308
 Donja Topličica, population 68
 Donja Zelina, population 847
 Donje Orešje, population 502
 Donje Psarjevo, population 311
 Dubovec Bisaški, population 86
 Filipovići, population 70
 Goričanec, population 77
 Goričica, population 370
 Gornja Drenova, population 322
 Gornja Topličica, population 157
 Gornje Orešje, population 251
 Gornje Psarjevo, population 467
 Gornji Vinkovec, population 66
 Hrastje, population 193
 Hrnjanec, population 409
 Kalinje, population 236
 Keleminovec, population 116
 Kladešćica, population 0
 Komin, population 250
 Krečaves, population 256
 Križevčec, population 102
 Laktec, population 175
 Majkovec, population 194
 Marinovec Zelinski, population 73
 Mokrica Tomaševečka, population 40
 Nespeš, population 338
 Novakovec Bisaški, population 30
 Novo Mjesto, population 147
 Obrež Zelinski, population 64
 Paukovec, population 342
 Polonje, population 344
 Polonje Tomaševečko, population 42
 Prepolno, population 71
 Pretoki, population 295
 Radoišće, population 250
 Salnik, population 72
 Selnica Psarjevačka, population 223
 Suhodol Zelinski, population 99
 Sveta Helena, population 366
 Sveti Ivan Zelina, population 2,764
 Šalovec, population 169
 Šulinec, population 214
 Šurdovec, population 33
 Tomaševec, population 198
 Velika Gora, population 82
 Vukovje Zelinsko, population 90
 Zadrkovec, population 214
 Zrinšćina, population 126
 Žitomir, population 193

History
In the late 19th and early 20th century, Sveti Ivan Zelina was a district capital in the Zagreb County of the Kingdom of Croatia-Slavonia.

From 1947 to 1990, during the communist regime, the town was known as Zelina.

Economy
Iskra company is one of the most important companies in Sveti Ivan Zelina.

Notable inhabitants
 Dragutin Domjanić, a poet

Education
Elementary and high-school are in Sveti Ivan Zelina.

Sport
There was a swimming pool in Sveti Ivan Zelina (at present under renovation). 
Field Hockey. 
Women's Handball.

References

Cities and towns in Croatia
Populated places in Zagreb County
Zagreb County (former)